Bolton-le-Sands is a civil parish in Lancaster, Lancashire, England. It contains 36 listed buildings that are recorded in the National Heritage List for England. Of these, two are listed at Grade II*, the middle grade, and the others are at Grade II.  Most of the listed buildings are houses, farmhouses and cottages dating from the 17th, 18th and early 19th centuries.  The Lancaster Canal passes through the parish, and five bridges crossing it are listed.  The other listed buildings include two churches, two schools, two public houses, a barn, a milestone, a cross base, and a pinfold.

Key

Buildings

References

Citations

Sources

Lists of listed buildings in Lancashire
Buildings and structures in the City of Lancaster